Igor Vladimirovich Syrov (born 19 September 1969) is a retired Russian professional football player.

Club career
He played in the Russian Football National League for FC Torpedo Volzhsky in 1995.

Honours
 Russian Second Division Zone 6 top scorer: 1993 (31 goals).

External links
 

1969 births
Living people
Soviet footballers
Russian footballers
Association football forwards
FC Energiya Volzhsky players
FC Nosta Novotroitsk players